Pähni Nature Reserve is a nature reserve which is located in Võru County, Estonia.

The protected area was founded in 2006 to protect valuable habitat types and threatened species in Pähni village (former Varstu Parish) and Sadramõtsa village (Rõuge Parish).

References

Nature reserves in Estonia
Geography of Võru County